The Attorney-General of the Duchy of Lancaster is the law officer of the Crown for matters arising in the Duchy of Lancaster.

Attorneys-General
1478–1483: Richard Empson
1519–1522: John Hales
1522–1526: Edmund Knightley
1526–1531: Thomas Audley
1531–1535: Robert Wroth
1535–1536: John Baker
1538–1540: William Coningsby
1544–1566: John Caryll
1566–1580: George Bromley
1580–1613: Sir John Brograve
1614–1638: Sir Edward Mosley
1638–1644: Sir Thomas Bedingfield
1644–1649: Bulstrode Whitelocke
1649–1654: Bartholomew Hall
1654–1660: Nicholas Lechmere
1660–1688: John Heath
1689–1714: Edward Northey
1714–1722: Alexander Denton
1727–1728: Spencer Cowper
1733–1736?: Thomas Abney
1758–1763: Fletcher Norton
1770–1777: John Skynner
1777–1810: John Ord
fl. 1840: William Russell
1869: Park
1893–1895: Samuel Hall

1921– : Sir Joseph Herbert Cunliffe
1946–1947: David Jenkins
1947–1951: Gerald Upjohn
1951–1969: Sir Milner Holland
1969–1970: John Brightman
1970–1972: Sydney Templeman
1972–1975: Christopher Slade
1976–1980: Thomas Bingham
1980–1984: Richard Scott
1984-1986: John Knox
1986-1989: Donald Rattee
1989-1991: Jonathan Parker
1991–1993: Mary Arden
1993–1996: Timothy Lloyd
1996–2001: Richard McCombe
2001–2006: Michael Briggs
2006–2012: Robert Hildyard
2012–2020: Robert Miles
2020–present Sonia Tolaney

References

History of Parliament Online

Duchy of Lancaster
 
Law Officers of the Crown in the United Kingdom